W.M. Mackenzie may refer to:

 Billy Mackenzie (William MacArthur MacKenzie, 1957–1997), Scottish singer
 William Macdonald Mackenzie (1797–1856), Scottish architect
 William Mackay Mackenzie (1871–1952), Scottish historian, archaeologist and writer